The siege of Stepanakert started in late 1991, during the First Nagorno-Karabakh War, in Stepanakert, the largest city in Nagorno-Karabakh, when the Azerbaijani forces circled the city. Until May 1992, the city and its Armenian population were the target of a months-long campaign of bombardment by Azerbaijan. The bombardment of Stepanakert and adjacent Armenian towns and villages, which took place under the conditions of total blockade by Azerbaijan, caused widespread destruction and many civilian deaths.

Human Rights Watch reported that the main bases used by Azerbaijani Armed Forces for the bombardment of Stepanakert included the towns of Khojaly and Shusha. Azerbaijani forces used weapons such as the BM-21 Grad multiple-launch rocket systems. The indiscriminate shelling, sniper shooting and aerial attacks killed or maimed hundreds of civilians and destroyed homes, hospitals and other buildings that were not legitimate military targets, and generally terrorized the civilian population. As a result of the offensive launched by Azerbaijan on Nagorno-Karabakh, more than 40,000 people became refugees and dozens of villages were burnt and ruined.

According to Memorial Human Rights Center, the residential areas of both Stepanakert and Shusha were shelled on a regular basis with the use of artillery and rocket launchers. There were more destruction and casualties in Stepanakert than in Shusha, which could be explained by location of Stepanakert in the lowland and much higher intensity of shelling from Shusha due to Azerbaijan's capture of Soviet depots in Aghdam and other locales with more than 11,000 wagons full of rockets, including those for BM-21 MLRS.

The siege of the city stopped only after the capture of Shusha by Armenian forces on May 8–9, 1992.

Background 
Stepanakert, or Khankendi, is a city located on Karabakh Plateau at the center of the Nagorno-Karabakh, a mountainous and landlocked region situated in the South Caucasus. Although the Armenian sources state that the settlement was first mentioned as Vararakn (meaning "rapid spring"), named after the river flowing through it, the Azerbaijani references generally say that the settlement was founded in the late eighteenth century as a private residence for khans of the Karabakh Khanate, and was thus called Khankendi (literally "the khan's village").

After the establishment of the Soviet authority, Khankendi was renamed Stepanakert (literally "the city of Stepan") by the decree of the Central Executive Committee of the Azerbaijani SSR, dated August 10, 1923, to honour Stepan Shaumian, leader of the 26 Baku Commissars. After that, Stepanakert was made the capital of the Nagorno-Karabakh Autonomous Oblast (NKAO) and gradually became a chief city for the Armenians in the region. According to the 1979 Soviet census, the city had a population of 38,980 people, mostly of Armenians, who constituted 87% of the total population, and more than four thousand Azerbaijanis.

In September 1988, a mass looting and pogrom took place, directed against the ethnic Azerbaijani population of the city, known as the Stepanakert pogrom. As a result, the city's Azerbaijani population fled the city.

Blockade 
Azerbaijan blockaded railroad lines and the delivery of oil and natural gas to Armenia and Nagorno-Karabakh since 1989. Since the fall of 1991 the imposed blockade became full and continuous. The blockades shattered the Armenian economy, sparked social unrest and created a devastating humanitarian crisis. Throughout the spring of 1992, Stepanakert (which had fifty five thousand inhabitants) was under siege – Azerbaijan had cut all the land communication between Armenia and Nagorno-Karabakh. Stepanakert had no access by road to Armenia for almost two years and its only link to the outside world was by helicopter across the mountains to Armenia. Thus many of its residents had been virtually trapped there all that time.

As a result of tightening of the blockade by Azerbaijan all essential supplies, including water, electricity, food and medicines were virtually cut off. The Armenians living in Stepanakert had to spend almost the whole time sheltering in basements and cellars in appalling conditions. According to Human Rights Watch, 

It was in these conditions of total blockade that Azerbaijan subjected Stepanakert to shelling and bombardment.

The siege
During the winter of 1991–92, Stepanakert was hit by artillery and aerial bombardment by Azerbaijani forces. In May 1992, when Helsinki Watch arrived to Stepanakert, the city had already suffered heavy destruction. On August 22–24 alone, Azerbaijani bombings had caused at least 40 civilian deaths and left 100 people wounded.

Helsinki Watch's report stated that the "Azerbaijani shelling and bombing were reckless and indiscriminate, and aimed at terrorizing and forcing out Armenian civilians. Like previous Azerbaijani attacks on Stepanakert, the shelling and bombing throughout the counter-offensive and beyond destroyed or damaged scores of homes and sometimes entire villages." According to Caroline Cox, "I used to count 400 Grad missiles every day pounding in on Stepanakert." The shelling aimed to intimidate and oust the Armenian civilian population from Karabakh and to take military control. In the words of the State Secretary of Azerbaijan in 1992 Lala-Shovket Gajiyeva, "For more than 100 days we were shelling Stepanakert, but the Armenians did not abandon their land".

David Atkinson, a member of the Council of Europe, reminded PACE that he visited Nagorno-Karabakh in the early 1990s, and added that he "will never forget" the Azerbaijani bombing of Stepanakert during a report on January 25, 2005, during the PACE winter session.

Geographically Stepanakert lay in the most vulnerable position, with Aghdam 15 miles to the East, Khojaly to the North and Shusha to the South. The Azeri controlled towns of Shusha and Khojaly were overlooking Stepanakert and were used as main bases for shelling and bombing the capital. Helsinki Watch writes, "While Azerbaijani forces held the town of Shusha, which overlooks Stepanakert, they pounded the latter with Grads and heavy artillery fire, hitting civilians, residential areas, hospitals, and the like... Russian pilot Anatolii Chistiakov said that the Azerbaijanis routinely ask mercenary pilots to drop tear gas to cause panic among civilians."

The mainstay artillery platforms used in the bombardment, which began on January 10, 1992 and lasted for 4 months, was the Soviet built BM-21 GRAD multiple rocket launcher capable of firing 40 rockets simultaneously, a modern variant of the widely used World War II weapon, the Katyusha. The GRAD launcher was similar to the Katyusha in that it did not have a well-guided missile system and hence the location of where it would hit was difficult to determine. Essentially, GRAD is designed to deliver anti-personnel devastation on an open battlefield, while the Azerbaijani Army used it to shell civilians in a densely populated capital of Nagorno-Karabakh. Dubbed "flying telephone poles" due to their long, thin shape, the missiles caused devastating damage to buildings including the destruction of residential houses, schools, the city's silk factory, maternity hospital and at least one kindergarten.

On May 31, 1992, the Chicago Tribune wrote:

Armenian response
By May 1992, Shusha was the only Azerbaijani-controlled area near Stepanakert during the First Nagorno-Karabakh War, which was used to launch GRAD missiles into Stepanakert's neighborhoods. Almost all of the civilian population of Karabakh was concentrated in Stepanakert after leaving due to the battle zone, and even poorly aimed bombing by Azerbaijani aircraft resulted in heavy losses of civilians. Karabakh's self-defense forces retaliated, and in two days of fighting captured Shusha the last Azerbaijani inhabited area in Nagorno-Karabakh. Thus they gained control over Nagorno-Karabakh, which brought an end to shelling and bombardment of Stepanakert, the capital of Nagorno-Karabakh Republic.

Daily bombardment by Azerbaijan's Grad missiles and attacks on Goris and Kapan caused thousands of civilian and military deaths, and massive property destruction. Bombs had been constantly directed towards Stepanakert, until the capture of Shusha, on May 8, 1992.

The town of Khojaly was on the road from Shusha and Stepanakert to Aghdam and had the region's only airport. The airport was of vital importance for the survival of the population in Karabakh, which had no land connection with Armenia and was under a total blockade by Azerbaijan. According to reports from Human Rights Watch, Khojaly was used as a base for Azerbaijani forces for shelling the city of Stepanakert. In February 1992 Karabakh self-defence forces captured Khojalu as this was the only way to stop the bombardment of Stepanakert from Khojalu and to breake the blockade.

International reactions
The United States Congress condemned Azerbaijan's blockade and aggression against Armenia and Nagorno-Karabakh passing amendment N: 907 to the Freedom Support Act (1992) which banned the US direct support to the government of Azerbaijan. The bill namely stated:  

Human rights organisation Christian Solidarity International (CSI) in its report on the First Nagorno-Karabakh War concludes that Azerbaijan was the primary aggressor and initiator of the Karabakh war because Azerbaijan  1)  organized forcible deportations of Armenians from Nagorno-Karabakh, 2) imposed a blockade on Karabakh and Armenia, 3) used heavy military force and bombarded the civilian areas. The report also states,

Helsinki Watch
A delegation of members from Helsinki Watch had gone to Stepanakert for two days. Armenians had said that Stepanakert was constantly attacked by Azerbaijanis, starting around 1991, in October. The Helsinki Watch members had gone around the city and had observed the widespread damage and photographed many damages to civilian areas. The delegation also noticed that almost every apartment in Stepanakert's western side, had been hit by shelling.

Representatives of Helsinki Watch, had photographed the complete destruction of a hospital, and also school buildings in parts of the city.

The Helsinki Watch concluded in their Annual Report that Azerbaijani forces had "pounded the capital of Nagorno Karabakh, Stepanakert, and other Armenian towns and villages with shells and grenades. The indiscriminate shelling and sniper shooting killed or maimed hundreds of civilians, destroyed homes, hospitals and other objects that are not legitimate military targets."

Journalists' accounts
Vanora Bennett, British reporter,

Journalist Vadim Byrkin, 

The Montreal Gazette reported,

Anzhelika Chechina, Russian Journalist and Human Rights Activist:

Los Angeles Times reporter John-Thor Dahlburg:

Chicago Tribune reporter Michael McGuire:

The UK Daily Telegraph:

Russian writer and human rights activist Inessa Burkova:  

Russian journalist Galina Kovalskaya

See also
Capture of Shusha
First Nagorno-Karabakh War
Sumgait pogrom (1988)
Kirovabad pogrom (1988)
Pogrom of Armenians in Baku (1990)
Operation Ring (1991)
Maraga Massacre (1992)
Anti-Armenian sentiment in Azerbaijan

Notes

References

External links
Indiscriminate Bombing and Shelling by Azerbaijani Forces in Nagorno Karabakh
Memories of Stepanakert: Karabakhi reporter compares to nights in the NKR capital 
Report: 20 Reportedly Killed in Nagorno-Karabakh
Azerbaijan's continuing siege of Stepanakert (Artsakh/Nagorno-Karabakh) by British journalist Russell Pollard
Life Goes Underground in a Capital Under Siege : Nagorno-Karabakh: Frightened citizens find refuge in cramped spaces beneath buildings as battles continue. February 25, 1992 by John-Thor Dahlburg, Los Angeles Times

Stepanakert
Stepanakert
Conflicts in 1991
Conflicts in 1992
1991 in Azerbaijan
1992 in Azerbaijan
1991 in Armenia
1992 in Armenia
Battles involving the Republic of Artsakh
First Nagorno-Karabakh War
1991 in the Nagorno-Karabakh Republic
1992 in the Nagorno-Karabakh Republic
Anti-Armenianism
Azerbaijani war crimes
War crimes in Azerbaijan
Anti-Armenianism in Azerbaijan